As of 2015 there were about 100,000 boarding schools in rural areas of Mainland China, with about 33 million children living in them. The majority of these boarding schools are in western China, which generally is not as wealthy as eastern and central China. As of 2015 many migrant workers and farmers in rural China send their children to boarding schools.

In addition to the rural boarding schools there are also boarding schools, including kindergartens, in urban areas.

Urban boarding schools
 about 4% of the children in urban areas, about 3.5 million, board. 1% of pupils at the primary level and 8% of pupils at the secondary levels board. The boarding schools are often close to students' residences, and parents believe that boarding helps the child concentrate more than if the grandparents supervised them. Chinese parents often do not have reservations over cost or over not being around their children that a Western parent would.

As of 2013 some children in urban areas are sent to boarding schools beginning at age 3. In 1949 the Chinese government established boarding kindergartens for orphans who lost their parents in preceding wars. The popularity of boarding kindergartens for wealthier families peaked in the 1990s, but the popularity declined afterwards, with some schools converting to day schools and others closing.

Rural boarding schools
The Chinese government began establishing boarding schools in rural areas and ethnic minority areas in the 1950s in order to give the children living there chances of getting formal education without having to move to urban areas. The establishment of boarding schools slowed during the Cultural Revolution, but other than that time, boarding schools had been established since then. Secondary boarding schools in centralized areas were established in the 1980s. These schools, covering junior secondary (junior high school) levels, are located in townships and towns.

, 11 million rural students at the primary level and about 21.76 million rural students at the secondary level board. , half of the secondary students and about 12% of the primary students in rural China board, with the number of primary school boarders being about 10 million.

Many parents in rural areas who find work in urban areas leave their children in rural schools while they work in urban areas since the parents are unable to enroll their children in urban schools, as a hukou from the urban areas is required for enrollment. Children who are left in rural areas are known as "left-behind children".  "left-behind children" with parents in cities make up about 60% of students at rural boarding schools.

Background
Originally day schools and teaching points, very small education centers, served the educational needs of rural areas at the primary level. The teaching points, each staffed by one or two teachers, covered grades 1–3.  Therefore, boarding schools at the primary level were uncommon in rural China.

The One Child Policy and migration into urban areas had caused a decline in the number of children in rural areas, and the educational quality between rural and urban areas varied significantly. The Chinese central government, as part of the 2001 Decision of the State Council on Basic Education Reform and Development, established a school merging program to consolidate primary-level village education. Beginning in 2000 many village schools have closed, and students were redirected to boarding schools. From 2000 to 2015, several thousand boarding schools opened, replacing about 240,000 village schools that had closed during the same period; this meant about 75% of China's village primary schools closed. The central government of China argued that replacing the village schools with boarding schools would allow resources to be used more effectively and increase the quality of the schools in the regions. Zhenzhou Zhao, author of the 2011 research article "A matter of money? Policy analysis of rural boarding schools in China," stated that the real reason many village schools closed was because the central government had passed taxation reforms that limited the amount of revenues received by local governments; therefore the closures of the village schools and redirections of the children were done to improve the financial situations of the local governments, which were still responsible for the education of the children in their areas.

In 2007 53.6% of secondary students in rural areas in western China boarded at school, and 11.6% of primary students in the same areas boarded. In ethnic minority provinces such as Guangxi, Tibet, and Yunnan the general percentage of secondary boarders is over 70%, while the percentage of primary boarders was over 20%.

In 2013 some regions had a shortage of managers of dormitories for rural primary schools. The Stanford University Freeman Spogli Institute for International Studies Rural Education Action Program (REAP) sought to recruit dorm managers.

Research
For her 2011 research article Zhenzhou Zhao conducted interviews in boarding schools in Guangxi and Qinghai, collecting over 2,500 student questionnaires, 95 student interviews, 325 teacher questionnaires, 63 teacher interviews, and over 100 parent questionnaires; the data came from a total of 21 schools. Zhenzhou Zhao concluded "children's interests are ignored and their rights overlooked in educational policy formulation and enactment" and that the schools "fail to provide a safe, healthy environment or protect and enable students' human rights".

References

Sources
Shu, Binbin (舒玢玢)and Yuying Tong (同鈺瑩)(Chinese University of Hong Kong Department of Sociology). "Boarding at School and Students’ Well-Being: The Case of Rural China" (Archive). Population Association of America 2015 Annual Meeting.
Zhao, Zhenzhuo (Hong Kong Institute of Education). "A matter of money? Policy analysis of rural boarding schools in China." Education, Citizenship and Social Justice. November 2011 vol. 6 no. 3. p. 237-249. DOI 10.1177/1746197911417415.

Further reading

Luo, Renfu (罗仁福; Chinese Academy of Sciences Center for Chinese Agricultural Policy (CCAP; 农业政策研究中心)), Yaojiang Shi (史耀疆; Northwest University Northwest Socio-economic Development Research Center (NSDRC; 社会经济发展研究中心)), Linxiu Zhang (张林秀; Chinese Academy of Sciences, CCAP), Chengfang Liu (刘承芳; Chinese Academy of Sciences, CCAP), Scott Rozelle (Stanford University), and Brian Sharbono (Stanford University). "Malnutrition in China's Rural Boarding Schools: the Case of Primary Schools in Shaanxi Province" (Archive). Asia Pacific Journal of Education. Vol. 29, p. 481–501. July 2009. Information page.
"Malnutrition in China’s Rural Boarding Schools: The Case of Primary Schools in Shaanxi Province" Archive, Ford Foundation, at Stanford University Freeman Spogli Institute for International Studies (FSI).

External links
 "Educational Challenges - Boarding Schools" (Archive). Stanford University Freeman Spogli Institute for International Studies (FSI).
  Chinese version: "教育面临的挑战 － 寄宿学校" (Archive).